Bochum (also  ,) is a city in North Rhine-Westphalia. With a population of 364,920 (2016), is the sixth largest city (after Cologne, Düsseldorf, Dortmund, Essen and Duisburg) of the most populous German federal state of North Rhine-Westphalia and the 16th largest city of Germany. On the Ruhr Heights (Ruhrhöhen) hill chain, between the rivers Ruhr to the south and Emscher to the north (tributaries of the Rhine), it is the second largest city of Westphalia after Dortmund, and the fourth largest city of the Ruhr after Dortmund, Essen and Duisburg. It lies at the centre of the Ruhr, Germany's largest urban area, in the Rhine-Ruhr Metropolitan Region, and belongs to the region of Arnsberg. Bochum is the sixth largest and one of the southernmost cities in the Low German dialect area. There are nine institutions of higher education in the city, most notably the Ruhr University Bochum (Ruhr-Universität Bochum), one of the ten largest universities in Germany, and the Bochum University of Applied Sciences (Hochschule Bochum).

Geography

Geographical position
The city lies on the low rolling hills of Bochum land ridge (Bochumer Landrücken), part of the Ruhrhöhen (highest elevations) between the Ruhr and Emscher rivers at the border of the southern and northern Ruhr coal region.

The terrain of Bochum is characterised by rolling hills that rarely have more than three per cent graduation. Steeper graduation can be found at the Harpener Hellweg near the Berghofer Holz nature reserve (3.4%), at Westenfelder Straße in the borough of Wattenscheid (3.47%), or at Kemnader Straße, which begins at the banks of the Ruhr in Stiepel, and rises to its highest point in the centre of Stiepel (a 5.1% increase).

It is surrounded by the cities of (in clockwise direction) Herne, Castrop-Rauxel, Dortmund, Witten, Hattingen, Essen and Gelsenkirchen.

Geology
There is sedimentary rock of carbon and chalk. The geological strata can be visited in the former quarry of Klosterbusch and at the Geological Gardens.

Waterways
The urban area is divided into the river Ruhr catchment in the south and the Emscher catchment in the north. The Ruhr's tributaries are the Oelbach (where as well a waste water treatment plant is established), Gerther Mühlenbach, Harpener Bach, Langendreer Bach, Lottenbach, Hörsterholzer Bach and the Knöselbach. The Ruhr in combination with upstream reservoirs is also used for drinking water abstraction. The Emscher's tributaries are Hüller Bach with Dorneburger Mühlenbach, Hofsteder Bach, Marbach, Ahbach, Kabeisemannsbach and Goldhammer Bach. The industrial developments in the region since the 19th century were leading to a kind of division of labour between the two river catchments, pumping drinking water from the Ruhr into the municipal supply system and discharging waste water mainly into the Emscher system. Today approximately 10% of the waste water in the Emscher catchment is discharged via the Hüller Bach. and treated in the centralized waste water treatment plant of the Emschergenossenschaft in Bottrop. The ecological restoration of the Emscher tributaries initiated by the Emschergenossenschaft started with the Internationale Bauausstellung Emscher Park in 1989.

Vegetation
These are generally mixed forests of oak and beech. The occurrence of holly gives evidence of Bochum's temperate climate. 844 species of plants can be found within the city limts

Climate
Bochum features an Oceanic climate (Köppen-Geiger classification Cfb) characterized by cool winters and short warm summers. Extreme temperatures are uncommon. However, temperatures rising above 30 °C (86 °F) are to be expected on multiple days in summer and the climate station closest to the City did record a peak temperature of 40 °C  (104 °F) on July 25, 2019.

On the other extreme, freezing temperatures are common between mid-November and late March. In some years, however, frosts may occur as late as early May. Temperatures below −10 °C are, especially in recent years, only seen on rare occasions. The city lies within the warmer extent of the 8a USDA plant hardiness zone (−12.2 to −9.4 °C or 10 to 15 °F). Some winters may pass without a frost below −5 °C (data from the nearest active climate station). These comparably mild conditions in Winter permit the planting of plants that would either not be reliably hardy or not able to bloom throughout Germany like Trachycarpus palms, Summer lilac, Paulownia tomentosa and Rosemary.

However, winters can be unpredictable with strong fluctuations in temperatures: In  mid-February 2021, the city was affected by a severe cold spell bringing temperatures down to –15 degrees Celsius (5 °F) accompanied by heavy snowfall which hindered traffic for multiple days. A week later, a temperature of 17 °C (63 °F) was recorded, an increase of 32°K.

The total precipitation of 815mm is distributed relatively even throughout most the year but has a peak in winter and two minima in late spring and July, respectively. June shows a second peak in precipitation due to the return of the westerlies which leads to more thunderstorms being generated along frontal boundaries of atlantic low-pressure systems. In recent years, the city was affected by summer and spring droughts. Thunderstorms are not uncommon in the warm season and can generate intense downpours and sporadically hail.

The city experiences little sunshine in winter with a minimum of 1,3h per day in December and a lot more in early summer and late spring with May featuring 7,5h per day.  The total amount of sunshine per year is 1689h.

Due to the cities northern latitude of 51°N, seasonal daylength variation is significant. The longest day of the year, June 21, features 16 h 38 min. of daylight while the shortest day of the year which is December 21 is only 7 h and 50 min. long.

Districts

 Wattenscheid includes Wattenscheid-Mitte,  Leithe, Günnigfeld, Westenfeld, Sevinghausen, Höntrop, Munscheid and Eppendorf (which includes Engelsburg and Heide).
 North includes Bergen, Gerthe, Harpen (including Rosenberg), Kornharpen, Hiltrop and Voede-Abzweig.
 East includes Laer, Werne, and Langendreer (including Ümmingen and Kaltehardt).
 South includes Wiemelhausen (which includes Brenschede, and Ehrenfeld), Stiepel (which includes Haar, Brockhausen and Schrick) and Querenburg (which includes Hustadt and Steinkuhl).
 Southwest includes Weitmar (which includes Bärendorf, Mark, and Neuling), Sundern, Linden and Dahlhausen.

Politics

Mayor
The current Mayor of Bochum is Thomas Eiskirch of the Social Democratic Party (SPD), who was elected in 2015 and re-elected in 2020.

The most recent mayoral election was held on 13 September 2020, and the results were as follows:

! colspan=2| Candidate
! Party
! Votes
! %
|-
| bgcolor=| 
| align=left| Thomas Eiskirch
| align=left| Social Democratic Party
| 85,397
| 61.8
|-
| bgcolor=| 
| align=left| Christian Haardt
| align=left| Christian Democratic Union
| 28,125
| 20.3
|-
| bgcolor=| 
| align=left| Amid Rabieh
| align=left| The Left
| 8,335
| 6.0
|-
| 
| align=left| Jens Lücking
| align=left| UWG: Free Citizens
| 3,937
| 2.8
|-
| bgcolor=| 
| align=left| Felix Haltt
| align=left| Free Democratic Party
| 3,441
| 2.5
|-
| bgcolor=| 
| align=left| Nils-Frederick Brandt
| align=left| Die PARTEI
| 3,357
| 2.4
|-
| bgcolor=| 
| align=left| Ariane Meise
| align=left| National Democratic Party
| 2,546
| 1.8
|-
| 
| align=left| Volker Steude
| align=left| The Citymakers
| 2,351
| 1.7
|-
| 
| align=left| Günter Gleising
| align=left| Social List Bochum
| 790
| 0.6
|-
! colspan=3| Valid votes
! 138,279
! 99.0
|-
! colspan=3| Invalid votes
! 1,438
! 1.0
|-
! colspan=3| Total
! 139,717
! 100.0
|-
! colspan=3| Electorate/voter turnout
! 287,216
! 48.6
|-
| colspan=5| Source: State Returning Officer
|}

City council

The Bochum city council governs the city alongside the Mayor. The most recent city council election was held on 13 September 2020, and the results were as follows:

! colspan=2| Party
! Votes
! %
! +/-
! Seats
! +/-
|-
| bgcolor=| 
| align=left| Social Democratic Party (SPD)
| 46,626
| 33.7
|  4.9
| 29
|  3
|-
| bgcolor=| 
| align=left| Alliance 90/The Greens (Grüne)
| 30,658
| 22.2
|  9.3
| 19
|  8
|-
| bgcolor=| 
| align=left| Christian Democratic Union (CDU)
| 28,799
| 20.8
|  4.9
| 18
|  4
|-
| bgcolor=| 
| align=left| The Left (Die Linke)
| 8,434
| 6.1
|  0.1
| 5
| ±0
|-
| bgcolor=| 
| align=left| Alternative for Germany (AfD)
| 7,774
| 5.6
|  2.1
| 5
|  2
|-
| 
| align=left| UWG: Free Citizens (UWG)
| 4,673
| 3.4
|  0.9
| 3
|  1
|-
| bgcolor=| 
| align=left| Free Democratic Party (FDP)
| 4,517
| 3.3
|  0.4
| 3
|  1
|-
| bgcolor=| 
| align=left| Die PARTEI (PARTEI)
| 3,223
| 2.3
| New
| 2
| New
|-
| 
| align=left| The Citymakers (Die Stadtgestalter)
| 2,387
| 1.7
|  0.6
| 2
|  1
|-
| colspan=7 bgcolor=lightgrey| 
|-
| 
| align=left| Social List Bochum (SLB)
| 814
| 0.6
|  0.2
| 0
|  1
|-
| bgcolor=| 
| align=left| National Democratic Party (NPD)
| 429
| 0.3
|  0.6
| 0
|  1
|-
! colspan=2| Valid votes
! 138,334
! 99.0
! 
! 
! 
|-
! colspan=2| Invalid votes
! 1,447
! 1.0
! 
! 
! 
|-
! colspan=2| Total
! 139,781
! 100.0
! 
! 86
!  2
|-
! colspan=2| Electorate/voter turnout
! 287,203
! 48.7
!  0.2
! 
! 
|-
| colspan=7| Source: State Returning Officer
|}

History

Bochum dates from the 9th century, when Charlemagne set up a royal court at the junction of two important trade routes. It was first officially mentioned in 1041 as Cofbuokheim in a document of the archbishops of Cologne. In 1321, Count Engelbert II von der Marck granted Bochum a town charter, but the town remained insignificant until the 19th century, when the coal mining and steel industries emerged in the Ruhr area, leading to the growth of the entire region. In the early 19th century it was part of the Grand Duchy of Berg, a client state of France, then it passed to Prussia following the Napoleonic Wars in 1815, and in 1871 it became part of the German Empire. The population of Bochum increased from about 4,500 in 1850 to 100,000 in 1904. Bochum acquired city status, incorporating neighbouring towns and villages. Additional population gains came from immigration, primarily from Poland. Bochum was the main center of the Polish community of the Ruhr, being the seat of various Polish organizations and enterprises. The Poles were subjected to anti-Polish policies aimed at Germanisation, and the Central Office for Monitoring the Polish Movement in the Rhine-Westphalian Industrial District (Zentralstelle fur Uberwachung der Polenbewegung im Rheinisch-Westfalischen Industriebezirke) was established by the German authorities in Bochum in 1909.

The Nazi era and World War II
On 28 October 1938, 250 Polish or stateless Jews were expelled from Bochum to Poland. On 9 November 1938, Kristallnacht, the Bochum synagogue was set on fire and there was rioting against Jewish citizens. The first Jews from Bochum were deported to Nazi concentration camps and many Jewish institutions and homes were destroyed. Some 500 Jewish citizens are known by name to have been killed in the Holocaust, including 19 who were younger than 16 years old. Joseph Klirsfeld was Bochum's rabbi at this time. He and his wife fled to Palestine. In December 1938, the Jewish elementary school teacher Else Hirsch began organising groups of children and adolescents to be sent to the Netherlands and England, sending ten groups in all. Many Jewish children and those from other persecuted groups were taken in by Dutch families and thereby saved from abduction or deportation and death.

On 15 July 1939, the Gestapo entered the headquarters of the Union of Poles in Germany in Bochum, searched it and interrogated its chief Michał Wesołowski, however, it did not obtain the desired lists of Polish activists, which had been previously hidden by Poles. Increased Nazi terror and persecutions of Poles followed, and in response, many Poles from the region came to Bochum for organizational and information meetings. During the German invasion of Poland, which started World War II in September 1939, the Nazis carried out mass arrests of local Polish activists, who were then sent to concentration camps. Local Polish premises and seats of organizations were looted and expropriated by Nazi Germany.

During the war, Germany operated a prison in the city with three forced labour subcamps within present-day city limits, an additional detention center, a camp for Romani people in the present-day Wattenscheid district, and three subcamps of the Buchenwald concentration camp. A report from July 1943 listed 100 forced labour camps in Bochum.

Because the Ruhr region was an area of high residential density and a centre for the manufacture of weapons, it was a major target in the war. Women with young children, school children and the homeless fled or were evacuated to safer areas, leaving cities largely deserted to the arms industry, coal mines and steel plants and those unable to leave.

During the Holocaust, in 1942–1943, local Jews were deported to German-occupied Czechoslovakia, Latvia and Poland.

Bochum was first bombed heavily in May and June 1943. On 13 May 1943, the city hall was hit, destroying the top floor, and leaving the next two floors in flames. On 4 November 1944, in an attack involving 700 British bombers, the steel plant, Bochumer Verein, was hit. One of the largest steel plants in Germany, more than 10,000 high-explosive and 130,000 incendiary bombs were stored there, setting off a conflagration that destroyed the surrounding neighbourhoods. An aerial photo shows the devastation.

The town centre of Bochum was a strategic target during the Oil Campaign. In 150 air raids on Bochum, over 1,300 bombs were dropped on Bochum and Gelsenkirchen. By the end of the war, 38% of Bochum had been destroyed. 70,000 citizens were homeless and at least 4,095 dead. Of Bochum's more than 90,000 homes, only 25,000 remained for the 170,000 citizens who survived the war, many by fleeing to other areas. Most of the remaining buildings were damaged, many with only one usable room. Only 1,000 houses in Bochum remained undamaged after the war. Only two of 122 schools remained unscathed; others were totally destroyed. Hunger was rampant. A resident of neighbouring Essen was quoted on 23 April 1945 as saying, "Today, I used up my last potato... it will be a difficult time till the new [autumn] potatoes are ready to be picked – if they're not stolen."

The US army ground advance into Germany reached Bochum in April 1945. Encountering desultory resistance, the US 79th Infantry Division captured the city on 10 April 1945.

After the war, Bochum was occupied by the British, who established two camps to house people displaced by the war. The majority of them were former Polish Zwangsarbeiter, forced labourers, many of them from the Bochumer Verein.

Allied bombing destroyed 83% of the built up area of Bochum during World War II. More than sixty years after the war, bombs continue to be found in the region, usually by construction workers. One found in October 2008 in Bochum town centre led to the evacuation of 400 and involved hundreds of emergency workers. A month earlier, a buried bomb exploded in neighbouring Hattingen, injuring 17 people.

Post-war period
After the war, Bochum was part of West Germany and the newly established state of North Rhine-Westphalia, consisting of the Rhineland and Westphalia.

In the postwar period, Bochum began developing as a cultural centre of the Ruhr area. In 1965, the Ruhr University was opened, the first modern university in the Ruhr area and the first to be founded in Germany since World War II. Since the seventies, Bochum's industry has moved from heavy industry to the service sector. Between 1960 and 1980, the coal mines all closed. Other industries, such as automotive, compensated for the loss of jobs. The Opel Astra was assembled at the Opel Bochum plant; however, by 2009, the factory was in serious financial difficulties and in December 2012, Opel announced that it would stop vehicle production at the Bochum plant in 2016.

In the course of a comprehensive community reform in 1975, Wattenscheid, a formerly independent city, was integrated into the city of Bochum. A local referendum against the integration failed. In 2007, the new synagogue of the Jewish community of Bochum, Herne und Hattingen was opened. In 2008, Nokia closed down its production plant, causing the loss of thousands of jobs, both at the plant and at local suppliers. 20,000 people showed up to protest against the closing. Within months, the Canadian high-tech company, Research in Motion, announced plans to open a research facility, its first outside Canada, adding several hundred jobs.

Places of interest

Architecture

 Bochum City Hall was built from 1927 to 1931 and was designed by architect Karl Roth as a modern office building, but in the Renaissance style, reflecting the industrial era's middle class, inventions and discoveries. There were statues of bronze and stone, and in the city council chambers, a bell tower. The ornate décor gave the Nazis an excuse to hound the then-mayor, who was of Jewish descent, driving him to suicide in 1933. Most of the bronze statues were melted down for the war effort and the stone carvings were damaged by the war, save for some small lion's heads over the entrance. Also left undamaged are two themed courtyard fountains made by August Vogel, the "Fountain of Beauty" and the "Fountain of Happiness", as well as Augusto Vasaris' florentine main entrance, which displays the motto, In Labore Honos (In labour lies honour). In 1951, a set of 28 chimes was installed, manufactured in Bochum. Known for their clarity of tone, they are the first cast steel chimes in the world. In front of the city hall is a large bell that was made by the Bochum "Verein für Bergbau und Gusstahlfabrikation AG" (Association for Mining and Cast Steel Manufacturing). It was damaged during World War II and can no longer be rung.
 Altes Brauhaus Rietkötter, the Old Rietkötter Brewing House is one of the oldest houses in Bochum, dating from 1630. Originally a private home, it became a brewery in 1777.  After nearly being torn down after the war, it now has preservation status and today houses a restaurant, where they still brew their own beer.
 The Kaufhaus Kortum department store dates from 1913 and was built as one of the nearly 20 regional stores owned by Alsberg Bros. (Gebr. Alsberg, AG) of Cologne. During the Nazi era, these stores were taken away from their Jewish owners and put into non-Jewish hands. Today, the "Kaufhaus Kortum" building has preservation status and houses an electronics store.
 The Friedrich Lueg Haus was built in 1924–1925 as the first high-rise building in Bochum. Contracted by the Lueg Company, the seven-story building was designed by the architect Emil Pohle. It suffered a fire during a bombing raid in 1944 and was renovated after the war. Today, the upper floors are small offices and internet companies. The seven-theatre Bochum Union Cinema rents the ground floor, showing a variety of domestic and international films.
 Mutter Wittig is a baroque-style building in the town centre, originally opened as a bakery and inn in 1870. Damaged in World War II, its façade is protected by preservation status. It houses a restaurant and its windows are decorated with displays of old Bochum.
 Sparkasse Bochum (Bochum Savings Bank) is a town landmark designed by the architect Wilhelm Kreis. It opened in 1928 and was emblematic of the modern era. It was heavily damaged during the war, but was afterwards restored to its former appearance.
 The Schlegel Tower is the only remaining structure of the once-important Schlegel brewery, which closed in 1980.
 The Jahrhunderthalle (Hall of the Century) is the former gas and power station of a steel mill built at the turn of the 20th century. With the closing of the mill, the plant was renovated and turned into a three-hall concert and event site with an industrial ambiance.
 Dahlhauser Heide is an example of social welfare provided by wealthy German industrialists for their workers. Built in the early 1900s by the Krupp family for their coal mine workers, the modest and tastefully designed two-family houses were to enable self-sufficiency by providing gardens and a stall for a pig or a goat, "the miner's cow". The estate, which has the appearance of a small, rural town, gained preservation status in the 1970s.
 Blankenstein Castle was built in the 13th century by Count Adolf I of the Mark. Though located in Hattingen, it is owned by Bochum and has a significant history. On 8 June 1321, Count Engelbert II of the Mark granted Bochum its town charter there. Today, only the gate and one tower remain.
 Haus Kemnade is a moated castle. Though located in the town of Hattingen, the castle is property of the city of Bochum in 1921. Documents regarding its earliest dates of construction have been lost; it is first mentioned in 1393. Parts of the castle were built during the Renaissance and baroque periods. The castle's location on the banks of the Ruhr river was changed when the flood of 1486 receded on the opposite side, cutting the castle off from the neighbouring village. The castle remained in private hands till 1921, when it was deeded to the city of Bochum. In 1961, a museum of local history was installed, including a large collection of 16th to 20th century musical instruments. A collection of East Asian objects is also now located there, as well as a satellite of the Bochum Museum and an art exhibition space. There is also a restaurant on site. Behind the castle is a timber-framed farmhouse from 1800, now a museum exhibiting farm life from the past.
 The Exzenterhaus is a commercial office building which is the tallest building in Bochum at 90.5 metres. It was constructed on top of World War II era bunker, with the more modern section of the building rising 15 storeys above the top of the bunker. The top 15 floors are split into three, five storey sections, each which cantilever up to 4.5 metres, giving the impression of twisting structure.

Religious architecture

 Propsteikirche St. Peter und Paul is the oldest church in Bochum, built between 785 and 800 by Charlemagne. It was rebuilt in the 11th century, but was severely damaged by fire in 1517. In 1547, it was again rebuilt, this time in the late Gothic style. The 68-metre (223 ft) high bell tower is one of the landmarks of Bochum. The interior includes a baptismal font from 1175, the reliquary shrine of St. Perpetua and her slave Felicitas, and a high altar with a crucifix from 1352.
 Pauluskirche is the main Protestant church of the city. After the Reformation, both Catholics and Lutherans shared the Propsteikirche, often contentiously. In 1655, the Lutherans began to build their own church with the help of donations from the Dutch Republic, Sweden, Courland and Denmark. The church was heavily damaged in a bombing raid on 12 June 1943 and was later rebuilt after the war. Next to the church is a monument to peace. A statue of an old woman searching for a loved one, it is also a memorial to the 4 November 1944 bombing raid on Bochum. Hans Ehrenberg served as minister here, until he was arrested and sent to Sachsenhausen by the Nazis.
 The Christuskirche, built in the neo-Gothic style, opened in 1879 and was among the most beautiful churches in Europe. In 1931, the room in the steeple was extended to a cenotaph for those killed in World War I. During an air raid in 1943, the church was destroyed, except for the steeple. After the war, the ruins were integrated into a new, modern structure and the steeple became a memorial dedicated to peace and understanding among nations.
 The neo-Gothic Marienkirche, built between 1868 and 1872, was heavily damaged in World War II (see photo above), but was rebuilt after the war. It is now closed and scheduled for demolition. The stained glass windows have been removed and it has fallen victim to vandalism.
 Stiepeler Dorfkirche is over 1000 years old and was commemorated by a stamp in 2008. A small church consisting of one room was built by Countess Imma von Stiepel. Between 1130 and 1170, the old church was replaced by a Romanesque basilica. Today, the steeple and transept remain. Between 1150 and 1200, the interior walls and ceiling were decorated with a number of Romanesque paintings.
 The new synagogue, which opened in 2007, consists of a white cube and stands in contrast to the round shape of the planetarium next door. The façade shows overall a variation on the Solomon's Seal achieved by relocated brickstones. The interior is graced with a gold-coloured canopy.

Parks and gardens

Bochum has a municipal zoo, a large municipal park and a number of other gardens and parks. The Ruhr University Botanical Gardens has thousands of plants from all over the world. Among others there is a tropical garden, a cactus garden, and a Chinese garden designed in the southern Chinese style, the only one of its kind in Germany.

The Geological Garden was the first of its kind in Germany. The nearly  park is the site of an old coal mine, the Zeche Friederika, which operated from 1750 to 1907. In 1962, the property came under environmental protection and a decade later was turned into a geological garden.

Other scenic areas include the West Park, Lake Kemnade, Lake Ümmingen and the municipal forest, Weitmarer Holz.

Society and culture

Leisure and entertainment
Bochum is a cultural centre of the Ruhr region. There is a municipal theatre, the Schauspielhaus Bochum, and about 20 smaller theatres and stages. The musical Starlight Express, which opened in 1988, is the longest-running musical in Germany.

Bermudadreieck
The Bermudadreieck (Bermuda Triangle), in the city center of Bochum, functions as the town's nightlife hub. Around sixty different bars and restaurants are located there, serving multicultural cuisine such as Japanese, Chinese, Indian, Italian, Spanish and German gastronomic specialties. Close to the Bermudadreieck is the Anneliese Brost Musikforum Ruhr, opened in 2016.

Annual events
 Jumble Sale – on the third Saturday of the month, in front of city hall
 April/May: Maiabendfest – local festival, hundreds of years old
 May: Steam Festival (every other year [even or odd?])
 June events:
Rubissimo, Ruhr University's summer festival
 Kemnade International
 Extraschicht – Night of Industrial Heritage (many locations all over the Ruhr area)
 June/July: VfL for Fun – summer festival for Bochum's football (soccer) team, VfL Bochum 1848
 July: Bochum Total (Rock Music Festival) – starts on the first weekend after school lets out
 July or August: Bochum kulinarisch – culinary treats from various cuisines, held the last weekend of summer vacation
 August: Bochumer Musiksommer, Bochum's Summer of Music
 September: Open Flair – international cabaret and street theatre
 October: Oktobermarkt – October Market
 October/November: Bochumer Bachtage – music of composer Johann Sebastian Bach
 October/November: Ruhrgebiets-Antiquariatstag – used and antique book sale
 November: Children's and Teenagers' Theatre
 December: Weihnachtsmarkt – Christmas Market – month-long open air market spread over the heart of downtown Bochum, includes performance stages

Museums

 The German Mining Museum is a museum about mining technology, complete with pithead tower.
 Railway Museum and Station Dahlhausen in the borough of Dahlhausen. Dr.-C.-Otto-Straße 191
 Zeiss Planetarium
 At the city's border with Herne-(Röhlinghausen), is the former mine Zeche Hannover with the Malakow Tower and engine hall. There is a steam-powered winding engine, which is operated at events.
 Zeche Knirps ("Small Boy Mine") located on the ground of Mine Hannover. It gives children the opportunity to experience the processes in a mine.
 Museum of local history Helf's Farm, Address: In den Höfen 37
 Farmhouse Museum located on the grounds of moated Kemnade Castle
 Museum of historic medical tools in the Malokos-Tower of former Mine Julius-Philipp from 1875. Address: Malakowturm, Markstraße 258a, 44799 Bochum
 Telefonmuseum, Karl-Lange-Str. 17
 Kunstmuseum Bochum, Kortumstraße 147, 44787 Bochum

Art galleries

 Museum of Art: The collection's focus is central and eastern European avant garde art, German expressionism, surrealism and outsider art. Kortumstraße 147, Bochum
 Ruhr University art collection: Modern art meets the classical. Marble and bronze portraits of Greek and Roman emperors, collection of antique Greek vases from the 9th to 4th century, B.C. Universitätsstraße 150, Bochum
 Schlieker House: In the former apartment and studio of German painter Hans-Jürgen Schlieker (1924–2004); changing exhibitions. Paracelsusweg 16, 44801 Bochum
 Situation Kunst: (Situation Art) Located at "Haus Weitmar" park. Indoor permanent exhibition with works by Gianni Colombo, Dan Flavin, Gotthard Graupner, Norbert Kricke, Lee Ufan, François Morellet, Maria Nordman, David Rabinowitch, Arnulf Rainer, Dirk Reinartz, Ad Reinhardt, Robert Ryman, Richard Serra, Jan J. Schoonhoven; also the Africa and Asia Room. Nevelstraße 29c, 44795 Bochum
 Musical Instrument Collection, Hans and Hede Grumbt: Large collection of musical instruments, also the clarinet collection of Johan van Kalker. An der Kemnade 10, 45527 Hattingen
 Ostasiatika Collection Ehrich: Kurt Ehrich's east Asian collection of Japanese netsuke, belt buckles, a display of the seven "lucky gods" and other additional objects. An der Kemnade 10, 45527 Hattingen, 
 ER MindArts: Contemporary Art online Gallery was established in Bochum in 2014. www.ermindarts.com

Public art

 Richard Serra's sculpture, "Terminal" is located in the town centre, near the central station. It consists of four 12-metre (over 39 feet) tall steel plates.
 Ulrich Rückriem's sculpture, "Ohne Titel" (titled "Untitled"), in front of the Kunstmuseum Bochum (Museum of Art).
 Memorial of the herdsman at Massenberg-Boulevard: Memorial for "the good old times", when Bochum was a farmers town. The herdsmans of the town guided until 1870 the cattle of the citizens to the "Vöde", a grassland outside the town limits, a part of it is today the municipal park. Local legends say it is "the last herdsman Fritz Kortebusch". But he died 1866, nevertheless he done this job for a long time. 
 Engelbert statue in the front of the Propsteikirche. In former times it was a fountain with statue at the Kortumstrasse. It is for memory of Earl Engelbert III, who founded the so-called Maiabendfest. It is often assumed that the statue shows his grandfather Engelbert II, who granted extended market rights to Bochum in 1321.
 Jobsiade-fountain at Husemann-Square. Shown is a scene of the examination of Hieronymus Jobs, the main character of the "Jobsiade", a comical poem of the poet Carl Armold Kortum.
 Collection of sculptures inside the municipal park.
 The bell in front of the city hall serves as a reminder of the improvement of steel-casting in Bochum. The bell was built in 1867 for the Paris World's Fair.
 Stolpersteine (literally, "stumbling stones") are small, cobblestone-sized, brass commemorative plaques which are set in sidewalks all over Europe, marking the homes or work places of Jews and others who were arrested and murdered during the Nazi era. There are 38 stolpersteine in Bochum.
 Cenotaph for the victims of the mine disaster at "Vereinigte Präsident" in 1936 at the graveyard in Bochum-Hamme. The sculpture was created by Wilhelm Wulff. Strict guidelines for artwork were in effect during the Nazi dictatorship, yet the sculpture follows only a few of them. The inscription also avoids typical Nazi phraseology.

Sports
 The football club VfL Bochum played in the first Division from 1971 to 1992, and from 1992 to 2010 was alternating almost every year between first and second Division, but mostly first. From 2010 to 2021 it played in the second Division (2. Bundesliga) before being promoted back to the first Division for the 2021–2022 season.
 Sparkassen Giro Bochum – annual road bike race.

Located companies

 ARAL AG (Head Office), an enterprise of the Deutsche BP AG
 Bochumer Eisenhütte Heintzmann GmbH & Co. KG – Mining, tunnelling and heat treatment
 Bochumer Verein – formerly the "Inoxum" part of the ThyssenKrupp enterprise, now Outokumpu Nirosta
 Bogestra (Head Office) – Bochum-Gelsenkirchener Straßenbahnen AG, local traffic firm
 Sparkasse Bochum – public-law bank
 Vonovia – Germany's largest residential property company (headquarters)
 Dr. C. Otto & Comp. – fire-proof materials
 Faber Lotto-Service GmbH
 G Data CyberDefense AG (Head Office) – contractor of IT security solutions. well-known product: G Data AntiVirus
 GEA Group AG founded in Bochum, headquarter moved to Düsseldorf in 2011
 Gebr. Eickhoff Maschinenfabrik und Eisengießerei GmbH
 GLS Bank
 I.S.T. Services
 Johnson Controls, just-in-time industry supplier for parts of the car, especially for Opel
 Meteomedia GmbH (Head Office) – private weather service, German subsidiary of the Swiss Meteomedia ag
 Möbel Hardeck – furniture shop
 Privatbrauerei Moritz Fiege, middle-large regional beer brewery
 QVC – call centre
 Roeser Medical
 ThyssenKrupp
 United Cinemas International
 USB Umweltservice Bochum GmbH – municipal disposal firm (100% subsidiary of the Bochumer Stadtwerke)
 Wollschläger Gruppe (Head Office) – trading house in the sector tooling equipment and machines (bankrupt)

Transport

Roads
Bochum is connected to the Autobahn network by the A 40, A 43 and A 44 autobahns. In addition, Bochum has a ring road, built to expressway standards, consisting of four segments; the Donezk, Oviedo, Nordhausen and Sheffield-Ring roads. It serves as a three-quarter loop around central Bochum and begins and ends at Autobahn A40. Ruhr University Bochum is also served by an expressway running from the Nordhausen-Ring to Autobahn A43. Until 2012, a new interchange (Dreieck Bochum-West) between the Donezk-Ring and Autobahn A40 is being constructed within tight parameters due to the existence of a nearby factory.

Apart from the autobahns and expressways, there is also a small ring road around the centre of Bochum, where most roads radiating out of Bochum begin. Most main roads in Bochum are multi-lane roads with traffic lights. Bochum is also served by the Bundesstraße 51 and Bundesstraße 226. B51 runs to Herne and Hattingen, and B226 runs to Gelsenkirchen and Witten.

Railways

Bochum has a central station situated on the line from Duisburg to Dortmund, connecting the city to the long-distance network of Deutsche Bahn as well as to the Rhine-Ruhr S-Bahn network.

Bus, tram, underground
Local service is supplied mainly by BOGESTRA, a joint venture handling transportation between the cities of Bochum and Gelsenkirchen. The Bochum Stadtbahn is a single underground line connecting the University of Bochum to Herne, and the Bochum/Gelsenkirchen tramway network is made up of several lines, partially underground, connecting to Gelsenkirchen, Hattingen and Witten. Public transport in the city is priced according to the fare system of the VRR transport association.

Waterways
As one of the few Ruhr area cities, Bochum is not directly connected with the German waterway net; the closest link is in the more northern located Herne at the Rhine-Herne Canal. In the south the border of Bochum is marked by the Ruhr. Up to the first half of the 19th century it was one of the most-travelled rivers in Europe and was mainly used for coal departure. Aside from cruise ships, it is no longer used for commercial navigation.

Air
The closest airports are Essen/Mülheim Airport (27 km), Dortmund Airport (31 km) and Düsseldorf Airport (47 km). To reach the airport in Düsseldorf, there are ICE, InterCity, RE and S railway lines. Other reachable airports are the Cologne Bonn Airport, the Weeze Airport, the Münster Osnabrück International Airport and the Paderborn Lippstadt Airport.

Education

Higher education
 Ruhr University Bochum, founded 1965
 Bochum University of Applied Sciences (Hochschule Bochum, formerly Fachhochschule Bochum)
 Georg Agricola University of Applied Sciences (TH Georg Agricola)
 Protestant University of Applied Sciences, Rheinland-Westphalia-Lippe (Evangelische FH Rheinland-Westfalen-Lippe)
 Schauspielschule Bochum (Bochum drama school)
 College of the Federal Social Security, Department of Social Insurance for Seafarers (Fachhochschule des Bundes der Sozialversicherung, Abteilung Knappschaft-Bahn-See)
 University of Health Sciences (Hochschule für Gesundheit)

Elementary and secondary schools
There are 61 primary schools, 9 Hauptschulen ("general schools") and 14 special schools.

In addition, there are 11 preparatory (British: grammar) schools ("Gymnasien"), 5 comprehensive schools ("Gesamtschulen"), 8 Realschulen and 2 private Waldorf schools.

"Gymnasien" – preparatory schools (British: grammar school):
 Goethe-Schule Bochum
 Graf-Engelbert-Schule
 Heinrich-von-Kleist-Schule
 Hellweg-Schule
 Hildegardis-Schule
 Lessing-Schule
 Märkische Schule
 Neues Gymnasium Bochum (school formed by merger of the former Albert-Einstein-Schule and Gymnasium am Ostring)
 Schiller-Schule
 Theodor-Körner-Schule

"Gesamtschulen" – comprehensive schools:
 Erich Kästner-Gesamtschule Schule
 Heinrich-Böll-Gesamtschule
 Maria Sibylla Merian-Gesamtschule
 Willy-Brandt-Gesamtschule
 Matthias-Claudius-Schulen

Realschulen – high schools:
 Anne-Frank-Schule
 Annette-von-Droste-Hülshoff-Schule
 Franz-Dinnendahl-Schule
 Hans-Böckler-Schule
 Helene-Lange-Schule
 Hugo-Schultz-Schule
 Pestalozzi-Schule
 Realschule Höntrop
 Freie-Schule Bochum (with elementary school)

Waldorf schools:
 Rudolf Steiner Schule Bochum
 Widar Schule Wattenscheid

Twin towns – sister cities

Bochum is twinned with:
 Sheffield, England, United Kingdom (1950)
 Oviedo, Spain (1980)
 Donetsk, Ukraine (1987)
 Nordhausen, Germany (1990)
 Tsukuba, Japan (2019)

There is a major road in Bochum named Sheffield-Ring after its sister city Sheffield, England. There is also a long section of dual carriageway on the south-western edge of Sheffield, between the suburbs of Meadowhead and Gleadless, named Bochum Parkway.

Notable people

 Lore Agnes (1876–1953), politician and women's rights activist
 Kurt Biedenkopf (1930–2021), politician (CDU), 1967–1969 Rector of the Ruhr University
 Jochen Borchert (born 1940), politician (CDU), 1993–1998 Federal Minister of Food, Agriculture and Forestry
 Willi Brokmeier (born 1928), operatic tenor
 Elmar Budde (born 1935), musicologist
 Wolfgang Clement (1940–2020), politician (SPD), former Minister of Economy and Labour
 Hans Ehrenberg (1883–1958), theologian, Nazi critic, and co-founder of the Confessing Church
 Manfred Eigen (1927–2019), 1967 Nobel Prize winner in chemistry
 Tommy Finke (born 1981), songwriter and composer
 Josef Franke (1876–1944), architect
 Kuno Gonschior (1935–2010), painter and university professor
 Frank Goosen (born 1966), cabaret artist and author, wrote Learning to Lie
 Herbert Grönemeyer (born 1956), actor (Das Boot), singer, songwriter of the song "Bochum"
 Claus Holm (1918–1996), actor, born in Bochum
 Else Hirsch (1889–1943), Jewish teacher who organised 10 Kindertransports to England and the Netherlands
 Max Imdahl (1925–1988), art historian
 Rolf Kanies (born 1957), actor, studied at Schauspielschule Bochum and performed at Schauspielhaus Bochum
 Heinz Kaminski (1921–2002), chemical engineer and space scientist
 Alfred Keller (1882–1974), general in the Luftwaffe during the Second World War
 Gershon Kingsley (1922–2019), Broadway musical director and composer, most notably of the electronic hit Popcorn
 Thomas Köner (born 1965), multimedia artist
 Carl Arnold Kortum (1745–1824), physician and writer
 Christine Lang (born 1957), German microbiologist
 Norbert Lammert (born 1948), politician (CDU), president (Speaker) of the Bundestag (German parliament)
 Karl-Heinz von Liebezeit (born 1960), actor, went to grammar and drama schools in Bochum
 Hans Matthöfer (1925–2009), politician (SPD)
 Ingo Naujoks (born 1962), actor
 Hans Werner Olm (born 1955), comedian
 Andrei Osterman (1686–1747), Bochum-born Russian statesman.
 Bastian Pastewka (born 1972), actor and comedian
 Konrad Raiser (born 1938), former General Secretary of the World Council of Churches, taught theology in Bochum
 Christian Redl (born 1948), actor, studied at Schauspielschule Bochum
 Armin Rohde (born 1955), actor
 Gerhard Charles Rump (born 1947), art historian and art dealer
 Otto Schily (born 1932), lawyer, politician (first The Greens, now SPD), former Minister of the Interior
 Hans-Jürgen Schlieker (1924–2004), painter
 Peter Scholl-Latour (1924–2014), German-French journalist and writer
 Paul Sethe (1901–1967), journalist
 André Tanneberger (born 1973), also known as "ATB", electronic music producer, began his career in Wattenscheid
 Jing Xiang (born 1993), actress at Schauspielhaus Bochum

Sport 
 Albert Bollmann (1889–1959), football player
 Hermann Gerland (born 1954), football player and coach
 Leon Goretzka (born 1995), football player, Olympic silver medalist
 Mark Warnecke (born 1970), breaststroke swimmer, won the world title at the age of 35
 Lirim Zendeli (born 1999), racing driver
 Joël Matip (born 1991), German-born Cameroonian football player

See also 

 VfL Bochum: personnel and celebrities
 Kruppwerke, part of the city of Bochum
 Südinnenstadt, part of the city of Bochum

References

External links

 
 

 
Cities in North Rhine-Westphalia
Ruhr
Holocaust locations in Germany
Members of the Hanseatic League